Cape Knowles is a cape rising to , marking the northern side of the entrance to Hilton Inlet, on the east coast of Palmer Land, Antarctica. It was discovered by members of East Base of the U.S. Antarctic Service in 1940, and named for geologist Paul H. Knowles, leader of the East Base sledging party that surveyed this coast as far south as Hilton Inlet.

References

Headlands of Palmer Land